Your Friend is the fourth studio album by Claire Kuo. It was released on 14 May 2010 by Linfair Records.

Following the release of this album, Claire Kuo was nominated in November 2010 at the 8th South East Best Billboard Awards for the Most Popular Female Singer Award in Hong Kong and Taiwan, of which she was a finalist.

Track listing 
"Encore LaLa"
"Dowry" / 嫁妆
"Chat" / 聊天
"Everyday is Different" / 每一天都不同 (Měi yītiān dū bùtóng)
"Finally We Love" / 总算我们也爱过
"There is Tenderness" / 有温柔
"Last Dance" / 最后一支舞
"From Today" / 今天起
"Leave Your Love" / 离开你的爱
"Throbbing" / 悸动

Music videos 
Encore LaLa MV
Dowry / 嫁妆 MV
Chat / 聊天 MV
Everyday is Different / 每一天都不同 MV
Finally We Love / 总算我们也爱过 MV

References 

Claire Kuo albums
2010 albums